The Politics of Cruelty is the debut full-length album by hardcore and metal band Gay for Johnny Depp. It was released on November 5, 2007.

Track listing
"Cumpassion" – 2:22
"You Have a Theory, I Have a Gun" – 1:12
"Belief in God Is So Adorable" – 1:43
"Lights Out!" – 2:12
"Noise" – 0:20
"Point the Finger (Juicy's Last $)" – 1:24
"Happens" – 0:24
"Very Little Good Happens Between 3 and 4 in the Morning" – 2:00
"Delirium Approaches (Slut Dust)" – 2:00
"To the Alcoholics: Life Is Depressing" – 1:34
"Here" – 0:22
"I Hate Our Freedom (Fuck You Gladys, I'm on Vacation)" – 6:07

Personnel
Sid Jagger – guitar, keyboards, vocals
Marty Leppard – vocals
Chelsea Piers – bass, percussion, keyboards
JJ Samanen – drums, piano

External links
 Gay for Johnny Depp official site

Gay for Johnny Depp albums
2007 debut albums